Sa'diyya Shaikh (born 1969) is a South African scholar of Islam and feminist theory. She is an associate professor of religion at the University of Cape Town. Shaikh studies Sufism in relation to feminism and feminist theory. Shaikh is known for work on gender in Islam and 'Ibn Arabi.

Biography 
Sa'diyya Shaikh was born in 1969 in Krugersdorp, South Africa to Indian Muslim parents. She grew up under the apartheid regime and witnessed the anti-apartheid movement which influenced her to seek liberatory readings of the Qur'an and the Islamic tradition.

Shaikh has published works on Muslim women and gendered violence, feminist approaches to the Qur'an and hadith, contraception and abortion in Islam, and gender and Islamic law. Shaikh was a 2016-2017 fellow at the Wissenschaftskolleg Zu Berlin on the project "Gender, Justice and Muslim Ethics."

Shaikh is the author of Sufi Narratives of Intimacy: Ibn 'Arabi, Gender, and Sexuality. The book explores the thought of Ibn 'Arabi from a feminist perspective.

Shaikh is the co-author of The Women's Khutbah Book: Contemporary Sermons on Spirituality and Justice from around the World. Two khutbahs of Shaikh are featured, "Spirituality of the Ordinary" and "Divine Love, Human Love: Marriage as Heart-Cultivation".

Works 

 Daniel C. Maguire and Sa'diyya Shaikh (eds). 2007. Violence Against Women in Contemporary World Religions: Roots and Cures. Cleveland, Ohio: The Pilgrim Press
 Shaikh, Sa'diyya. 2012. Sufi Narratives of Intimacy: Ibn 'Arabi, Gender and Sexuality. Chapel Hill: University of North Carolina Press
 Fatima Seedat and Sa'diyya Shaikh. 2022. The Women's Khutbah Book: Contemporary Sermons on Spirituality and Justice from around the World. Yale University Press.

References 

1969 births
Living people
Women scholars of Islam
Proponents of Islamic feminism
Scholars of Sufism
South African Muslims
South African women academics
People from Krugersdorp
South African people of Indian descent
South African feminists
Ibn Arabi scholars
Academic staff of the University of Cape Town

South African Sufis